USS Natahki (YTB-398) was a  harbor tug that served in the United States Navy from 1945 into the mid-1980s. The exact date she was decommissioned is unknown.
 
Natahki was assigned to the Pacific Fleet (11th Naval District, San Diego, California) upon delivery to the Navy. She served out the duration of World War II there and into 1946 when, like many wartime ships, she was placed in reserve as surplus. In 1951, Natahki was withdrawn from reserve and re-activated in the 11th Naval District. Records of her service from 1951 onward are virtually non-existent although presumably she served in southern California ports for the remainder of her career.  Natahki was re-designated a district harbor tug, medium (YTM) in February 1962.

Her name was struck from the Navy list sometime in the mid-1980s and she was sold for scrapping by the Defense Reutilization and Marketing Service (DRMS), 6 April 1987.

References

Navsource.org

 

Sassaba-class tugs
Ships built in Jacksonville, Florida
1944 ships
World War II auxiliary ships of the United States